Labrisomus cricota, the Mock blenny, is a species of labrisomid blenny native to the western Atlantic Ocean and the Caribbean Sea where it occurs on rocky bottoms with plentiful algal growth at depths down to . It is believed that the territorial males keep harems of females. This is a species sought after by local subsistence fisheries.

References

cricota
Fish described in 2002